Rolf Johan Furuli (born 19 December 1942) is a Norwegian linguist who was a lecturer. in Semitic languages at the University of Oslo; he retired in 2011. Furuli has taught courses of Akkadian, Aramaic, Ethiopic, Hebrew, Phoenician, Syriac, and Ugaritic at the University of Oslo and at The Norwegian Institute of Paleography and Historical Philology.

Life

Education 

Furuli started his studies of New Babylonian chronology in 1984. In 1995 he graduated from the University of Oslo with a Master of Arts degree, with a thesis on the system of verbs in classical Hebrew. In 2005 he received his Doctor of Arts with a thesis on definite and indefinite verbs in the Hebrew Bible. In 2005, Furuli defended his doctoral thesis suggesting a new understanding of verbal system of Classical Hebrew.

In a review of the thesis, professor Elisabeth R. Hayes of Wolfson College, Oxford, wrote: "While not all will agree with Furuli's conclusions regarding the status of the wayyiqtol as an imperfective form, his well-argued thesis contributes towards advancing methodology in Hebrew scholarship." Old Testament lecturer David Kummerow stated that Furuli's research "has gone astray in that his methodology has assumed too much", adding that "the value of Furuli's research is not to be found in his 'new understanding' but rather in the helpful extended cataloguing of non-prototypical and construction-dependent functions of the verbal conjugations of [biblical Hebrew]". Professor John A. Kaltner said:

Teaching 

From 1999 Furuli held a position as assistant professor at the University of Oslo, before retiring in 2011.

Religious affiliation 

Furuli was a Jehovah's Witness and served as an elder for 56 years, also holding positions as a circuit overseer and a district overseer. In 2020, Furuli published a book entitled My Beloved Religion—and the Governing Body in which he maintains that the denomination's core doctrines and interpretations of biblical chronology are correct, but challenges the authority of the Jehovah's Witnesses' leadership. Subsequently, on June 17, 2020 he was disfellowshipped from the denomination.

Religious views 

Furuli has defended the religious views of Jehovah's Witnesses, including their view that Jerusalem was destroyed by the Babylonians in 607 BC rather than the broadly recognised dating of its destruction in 587 BC. In response, in a 2004 issue of Journal for the Study of the Old Testament, Lester L. Grabbe, professor of Hebrew Bible and Early Judaism at the University of Hull, said of Furuli's study: "Once again we have an amateur who wants to rewrite scholarship. ... F. shows little evidence of having put his theories to the test with specialists in Mesopotamian astronomy and Persian history."

Works 

Furuli has written works about Bible translation and biblical issues. He has translated a number of documents from Semitic languages and Sumerian into Norwegian.

Theses

Books 

 (in Norwegian and Danish)

 

 (250 pages).

 (1550 pages).
 (363 pages).

Articles

Translations 

 (translated from Ge'ez to Norwegian)
 (translated from Hebrew and Aramaic)
 (translated from Sumerian into Norwegian)
 (translated from Ge´ez into Norwegian)
 (translated from Ugaritic, Phoenician, and Hebrew into Norwegian)

See also 

 Atra-Hasis
 Bible chronology
 Book of Enoch
 Dead Sea scrolls
 Egyptian chronology
 Gilgamesh
 Hebrew verb conjugation
 New World Translation of the Holy Scriptures
 Waw-consecutive

References

Sources

1942 births
Living people
Linguists from Norway
Norwegian translators
Semiticists
Academic staff of the University of Oslo
Norwegian Jehovah's Witnesses
People disfellowshipped by the Jehovah's Witnesses